Magic Springs Theme and Water Park, known as Magic Springs, is an amusement park and water park located in Hot Springs, Arkansas, about  from Little Rock.  A single price admission includes all day use of the rides and attractions in both parks. The park is open weekends from April through October and daily late-May through mid-August.  Magic Springs Theme and Water Park was opened in 1977, closed in 1995, and reopened in 2000.  Magic Springs Theme and Water Park is owned by EPR Properties and operated by Premier Parks, LLC.

History
Magic Springs Family Fun Park opened July 22, 1978, under the management of Leisure and Recreation Concepts, headed by Dallas businessman Michael Jenkins. Over time, investors became burdened by millions of dollars of debt and sold the park in the 1980s to a group headed by businessman Melvyn Bell, who then had his own financial troubles. It closed in 1995. Fitraco, a Belgian company, bought the amusement park at a foreclosure auction in 1995. Ed Hart of Themeparks LLC was approached by Fitraco, and decided to take on the project.

Magic Springs and Crystal Falls reopened on May 27, 2000, after Hot Springs voters approved a bond issue providing financing for the park.  Attendance totaled more than 362,500 in 2000 and beat expectations. In 2001, attendance fell about 25 percent to roughly 272,000, and then to about 254,000 in 2002. The park continued to expand its ride offerings instead of hunkering down. Attendance grew again to more than 291,000 in 2003, the year the Timberwood Amphitheater debuted. It topped 400,000 in 2004 when The Gauntlet was added and the concert series was expanded. In March, owners of Magic Springs agreed to sell the attraction to CNL Income Properties. They leased back the park to the former owners, who continued to manage it. On June 10, 2008, it was announced that PARC Management had taken over the park's management. The leasing agreement between owner CNL and PARC Management was terminated in November 2010 and a new operating agreement with Amusement Management Partners, LLC was announced in January 2011. In late 2016, CNL sold a bundle of its theme park properties, including Magic Springs, to EPR Properties, a REIT based in Kansas City. It was announced at that time that management responsibilities for Magic Springs would be assumed by Premier Parks, LLC. At that time the name was changed to Magic Springs Theme and Water Park.

Rides and attractions

Roller Coasters

Thrill rides

Family rides

Kids' rides

Former rides
Twist N' Shout Zamperla Wild Mouse – Added in 2000. Removed in 2012. Relocated to Family Kingdom in Myrtle Beach, South Carolina.
Dr. Deans Rocket Machine - Added in 2002. Removed for the 2016 season.
Wild Thang - Removed before the 2016 season, relocated to Frontier City  and opened as 'Gunslinger.'
Roaring Tornado - Added in 1980 and sold in 1990. It was relocated to Denver, Colorado. It is now owned by Elitch Gardens and operates under the name "Sidewinder."
Sky Hook - Originally opened in 1963 at Six Flags Over Texas, closed in 1968, relocated to Six Flags Over Georgia, closed in 1977. Relocated and opened in 1978, converted into a bungee-jumping platform. Removed in 1995, dismantled and sold for scrap. Originally built in 1910 as a Von Roll Holding Cargo Crane in Switzerland.

Timberwood Amphitheater

The Timberwood Amphitheater is a state-of-the-art 5,000-seat concert venue which offers a variety of entertainment. Concerts are held every Saturday during the operating season. While there is free lawn seating, there are also 26 rows of bench reserved seats in front of the stage. Currently VIP Reserved seats (the first six rows) are $10.00 while the price for the rest of the reserved seats is $5.00.

Annual events
Education In Motion - School group days where fun at the park is linked to lessons in the classroom.
Magic Screams - Halloween festival in October where Magic Springs is transformed into a scary and frightening Magic Screams.

Water Park
Crystal Falls is the water park portion of Magic Springs Theme and Water Park and is included with park admission.  Crystal Falls is open daily from May through mid-August and weekends to the end of September.  Crystal Falls has many water attractions which include:

Bear Cub Bend - kid play zone
Crystal Cove Wave Pool
Crystal Lagoon - four tube slides, three body slides and an activity pool (Opened in 2007)
Grizzly Creek Splash Zone - kid activity zone with a suspended bridge and three smaller water slides
High Sierra Slide Tower - four tube slides, each different in darkness
Kodiak Canyon Adventure River
Rapid Falls Raceway - seven side-by-side racing slides (Opened in 2008)
Boogie Blast - FlowRider wave simulator (Opened in 2010)
Splash Island - Whitewater Giant Water Play Area (Opened in 2012)

Awards
"Best of the Best" – Arkansas Democrat Gazette, Readers Poll
Golden Guard Award – Excellence in lifeguarding, Ellis & Associates
Southern Travel Treasure – AAA
Gold Elite Award – Performance of water safety staff, Ellis & Associates
Platinum Elite Award – Performance of water safety staff, Ellis & Associates
The Natural State Award – Arkansas' top tourist attraction, Arkansas Governor's Conference on Tourism
Best Area Attraction – Hot Springs Sentinel-Record, Readers Poll
Silver Elite Award – Excellence in lifeguarding, Ellis & Associates
Large Business Recognition – Excellence in landscaping, Hot Springs/Garland County Beautification Commission
Large Business of the Year – Excellence in community service, Hot Springs Chamber of Commerce
Outstanding Achievement for Access to Persons with Disabilities – S.A.I.L.S.
Silver Cup – Outstanding effort in tourism, Garland County Hospitality Association
Top Three Family Friendly Parks in the Nation – Better Homes and Gardens

Incidents

 On June 9, 2007, a power outage left 12 riders on the X-Coaster stranded upside down, 150 feet in the air, for 30 minutes.
 On September 4, 2006, an 11-year-old boy was shot in the wrist by a falling .22 caliber bullet.
 On July 30, 2006, a 45-year-old woman from Memphis, Tennessee fell from the Twist and Shout coaster. Inspectors said that she was too large for the ride, causing the restraints to not work properly.
 On July 24, 2017, the X-Coaster malfunctioned, leaving riders stranded 50-feet in the air for one hour. Eventually, the train was manually returned to the station.

See also
Kentucky Kingdom, Amusement park in Louisville, Kentucky formerly operated by Themeparks LLC
Themeparks LLC, Amusement park company founded by Ed Hart

References

External links
Official Magic Springs Theme and Water Park Site

 
Amusement parks in Arkansas
Water parks in Arkansas
Buildings and structures in Hot Springs, Arkansas
Premier Parks, LLC
Former PARC Management theme parks
Amusement parks opened in 1978
1978 establishments in Arkansas
Tourist attractions in Garland County, Arkansas